Iri-ye Olya (also Romanized as Īrī-ye ‘Olyā, Īry-e-’Olyā, Īrī-e ‘Olyā, and Iri Olya; also known as Iri, Īrī-e Bālā, and Īrī-ye Bālā) is a village in Arzil Rural District, Kharvana District, Varzaqan County, East Azerbaijan Province, Iran. At the 2006 census, its population was 635, in 148 families.

References 

Towns and villages in Varzaqan County